Amolops larutensis (common names: Larut sucker frog, Larut Hill cascade frog, southern pad-discked frog) is a species of frog in the family Ranidae that is found in the Malay Peninsula from southernmost Thailand to Malaysia; records further north probably represent A. panhai.

Description
They have large discs in their finger tips and smaller ones in the toe tips. They have granular skin; their back is pale yellowish green with dark blotches but they are white from under. Tadpoles have large ventral suckers which they use to attach themselves to rocky surfaces.

Habitat
Amolops larutensis is a common and abundant species occurring on boulders and bedrock in and along fast-flowing, clear-water forest streams both in lowlands and highlands. It may be the most common frog in forest boulder streams all through the Malay Peninsula. It is not considered threatened by the International Union for Conservation of Nature (IUCN).

References

External links
Amphibian and Reptiles of Peninsular Malaysia - Amolops larutensis

larutensis
Amphibians described in 1899
Amphibians of Malaysia
Amphibians of Thailand
Taxa named by George Albert Boulenger
Taxonomy articles created by Polbot